Nervo (stylised as NERVO) are an Australian DJ duo comprising twin sisters Olivia and Miriam Nervo (born 18 February 1982). After signing with Sony/ATV Music Publishing at 18 years of age, the sisters pursued careers as songwriting partners and in 2008 they signed with Fredrik Olsson and his Swedish music publishing company Razor Boy Music Publishing, which led to co-writing the Grammy Award-winning single, "When Love Takes Over", performed by David Guetta and Kelly Rowland.

Early life
The Nervo twins were born in Ivanhoe, Melbourne on the night of 18 February 1982. In 2012, the twins told a reporter that they "almost have the same birthday", but in 2021 they said they share a birthday. Olivia was born first. The twins were reported 27 years old in December 2009, putting their birth year at 1982. Their parents were Dr. Flaviana Benedetti and Dr. Garry Nervo who had established a dental practice together in 1975 in Whittlesea, Victoria, Australia, north of Melbourne. The Italian-heritage family included older sister Adele Nervo and younger brother Morris Nervo. Around 1992 the family moved to Ivanhoe, Victoria. The twins studied at Genazzano FCJ College, a girls school in Kew, where they participated in rowing and swimming, but were mainly involved in music. They completed Year 12 and graduated in 1999. The twins began their careers as models with the Australian Chadwick Models Agency.

Career
When the sisters were sixteen, a modeling agency took an interest in the pair, but Liv Nervo stated in April 2012 that music "was always the focus" for them.

The sisters were accepted into the Opera Australia Academy, but decided to pursue a music career instead. A contract was then signed with Sony/ATV Music Publishing and the duo subsequently embarked on a songwriting career. Initial recognition for the pair occurred following the single "Negotiate with Love", written for British pop singer, Rachel Stevens, which reached tenth position in the United Kingdom (UK) music charts in 2005. Also in 2005, the duo released the single "Boobjob", which received substantial airplay in their native Australia. The duo went on to write for Kesha, Richard Grey, Sophie Ellis-Bextor, Ashley Tisdale and the Pussycat Dolls.

When their publishing deal was set to expire they considered dropping their songwriting career due to a dissatisfaction with the modest level of success they had experienced while with the major publisher. Instead they were persuaded to give it another chance by signing with Fredrik Olsson (Music Executive) and his Swedish music publishing company Razor Boy Music Publishing in 2008. The move reaped quick rewards when the new publisher arranged a writing session with Kelly Rowland through Universal A&R Max Gousse. The group co-wrote Guetta and Rowland's number one dance hit, "When Love Takes Over" which went on to win a Grammy Award, in addition to reaching the top position on numerous charts around the world. The song was also ranked the No. 1 dance pop collaboration of all time by Billboard.

In March 2010, Nervo announced a worldwide recording deal with Virgin Records/EMI Music, which included a joint venture to release new artists that Nervo discover and produce. They also served as ambassadors at the L'Oreal Fashion Festival. A month later, Nervo released their club single "This Kind of Love" through their independent UK-based dance record label, Loaded Records. It went number one on the world club charts, number two on the Music Week club charts and number six on the Music Week pop charts. In June 2010, Allison Iraheta released the single "Don't Waste the Pretty", co-written by Nervo. The twins also worked on records for Kylie Minogue's eleventh Aphrodite, Britney Spears, Cheryl Cole, Sophie Ellis-Bextor, Armin Van Buuren and for Kelly Rowland's self-titled, third studio album. They also released the single "Irresistible" on Positiva/Armada, which reached number one on the UK Club Chart.

In July, after DJing at Belgium's Tomorrowland, they wrote a track with Afrojack, "The Way We See The World (Tomorrowland Anthem)" and followed this with "We're All No One" featuring Afrojack and Steve Aoki which reached number 27 on the UK Dance charts. In August, Nervo signed with modeling agency, Wilhelmina Models. They were also featured in Pacha magazine. They wrote the track "Night of Your Life" performed by Jennifer Hudson on David Guetta's new album Nothing but the Beat. They wrote, vocally produced and arranged Agnes Carlsson's single "Don't Go Breaking My Heart". The group also wrote Nicole Scherzinger's single "Try With Me".

In 2011, the sisters began hosting a monthly show on Sirius Radio called "Nervonation".

The single "You're Gonna Love Again" was leaked in 2011 and reached the No. 1 position on the Hype Machine chart. It was officially released in 2012.

Nervo began their 2013 music production schedule with "Like Home", with Nicky Romero, followed by the Nervo single "Hold On", which was released to iTunes on 9 April. The music video for "Hold On" was released on 19 April and uploaded to their VEVO channel on YouTube. In June 2013, Nervo were featured on the cover of Spanish magazine S Moda and a feature article that included further posed photographs was published on the magazine's website in May. In July 2013 Nervo wrote Daichi Miura's single "GO FOR IT". In November they also worked on records for Daichi Miura's fourth "The Entertainer", which reached No. 5 on the Japan chart.

On 24 February 2015, the twins released a new single titled "It Feels." In March, they also collaborated with Kreayshawn, Dev and Alisa Ueno for "Hey Ricky". Both "Hey Ricky" and "It Feels" appear on their forthcoming debut artist album Collateral, set for release on 24 July 2015.

Also, from Collateral, was "The Other Boys" featuring  Kylie Minogue, Jake Shears and Nile Rodgers, was a remix single that was released on 23 October 2015.

In 2016, the Nervo song "People Grinnin'" served as the foundation for a video produced by eight universities led by the University of South Wales. The video was part of an Australian campaign to attract more women to engineering programs. In the video, the Nervo twins are shown as futuristic androids designed by women engineers.

In 2017, A3 enlisted Nervo for his remix of Guns N' Roses' "November Rain".

In 2018, the duo's collaboration with Sofi Tukker, the Knocks and Alisa Ueno on the former's “Best Friend” (used in a 2017 television commercial for iPhone X) gave Nervo their first number one on Billboard's Dance/Mix Show Airplay Chart in its January 20, 2018 issue. In June, the Fédération Internationale de Volleyball (FIVB) and Nervo teamed up to have their song "Worlds Collide" be the anthem for the FIVB Volleyball Nations League (VNL) for men and women. Nervo first performed "Worlds Collide" live in Ottawa, Canada for the Canada vs. USA men's match on June 10. Nervo also performed the song live at the Women's VNL Finals in Nanjing, China and the Men's VNL Finals in Lille, France.

In October 2021, Nervo's song "Horizon" was used in a mini art film created within the Las Vegas mega-club Omnia. This mini art film was the first installment of One. One is a project series with content focused on storytelling, music, dance, and exotic locations, all with a dance music sound and Cirque du Soleil flair.

Film and television
In May 2013, the duo filmed scenes for the soap opera One Life to Live that included dialogue in addition to their performing DJ roles. The women also appear on Episode 6 of the TV show Styled to Rock set to air 29 November 2013.

They are profiled in the 2020 documentary film Underplayed.

Personal lives

On 31 December 2018, the twins announced that they are both pregnant via an Instagram post.

Live performances

2010
In 2010, Nervo played on the Ultra Main Stage during the Winter Music Conference.

2011
In June 2011, Nervo opened for pop singer, Britney Spears on her sixth concert tour, the Femme Fatale Tour, along with Nicki Minaj and Jessie and the Toy Boys. They then hit the iD festival tour. They also launched a Las Vegas DJ residency with the Wynn Las Vegas. The duo also performed a DJ set at Belgium's Tomorrowland event.

In September they played twice at Pacha in Ibiza, at two of the islands biggest club nights – David Guetta's Fuck Me I'm Famous, and then the closing party of Pete Tongs All Gone Pete Tong.

2012
In 2012, Nervo played at Creamfields alongside Fatboy Slim and Dream Valley Festival booth in Brazil and the Sunset Music Festival in Tampa. They also played at the Electric Daisy Carnival in Las Vegas and the Spring Awakening Music Festival in Chicago in June 2012. In July 2012, the twins DJd again at Belgium's Tomorrowland and performed at the Electric Zoo event in New York City, over the American Labor Day weekend.

The twins played at the Voodoo Experience in New Orleans, Louisiana, US, in October 2012. They also played at Escape from Wonderland in San Bernardino, US on 27 October 2012.

On 7 November 2012 Covergirl announced the signing of Nervo.

2013
In January Nervo played on the bill of Central America's first electronic music festival The Day After. The festival was held in Panama City, Panama and also featured David Guetta, Afrojack, Rehab and others.

Nervo played twice at Ultra Music Festival in Miami, Florida, U.S. They played on the "Ultra Worldwide" stage on Weekend 1 and on the "Main Stage" during Weekend 2.

During March and April they toured throughout Mexico with the Alive Music Festival, alongside Dimitri Vegas & Like Mike.
In April they also announced a residency at Hakkasan Nightclub in the MGM Grand Las Vegas

In June they played at Boonstock in Gibbons, Alberta, Canada and also returned to Electric Daisy Carnival in Las Vegas to play the Circuit Grounds.

In July they performed at the first Electric Daisy Carnival in London, followed by the Main Stage and the Dim Mak Stage (alongside Steve Aoki) at Belgium's Tomorrowland festival. The twins also headed back to Ibiza for their Nervo Nation residency at Ushuaia Beach Hotel.

In August they played at the MTV Video Music Awards Red Carpet Ceremony as well as the MTV VMA event hosted by CoverGirl at the Music Hall of Williamsburg in Brooklyn.

In September they played at the three-day TomorrowWorld Festival in Chattahoochee Hills, Georgia, US. The festival was the inaugural US version of the Belgian Tomorrowland event and was held at a farm near Atlanta.

In October they played on the same bill as Empire of the Sun, A-Trak and Mord Fustang at Spookfest. Held at the Oracle Arena in Oakland, California, US, Spookfest is an event organised by the Live 105 radio station and its electronic dance music specialty program "Subsonic".

In December they played at ZoukOut , one of Asia's biggest music dance festivals

2014
Nervo performed at the second edition of summerland festival in Colombia on 5 January and at the fourth annual Avila Beach Party on 23 May along with Cash Cash and Manufactured Superstars

Nervo performed at Digital Dreams 2014 in Toronto, Ontario, Canada along with many others like Dimitri Vegas & Like Mike, Eric Prydz and Tiesto. In addition, Nervo also performed at Escapade 2014 in Ottawa, Ontario, Canada alongside well-known DJ's, such as Kaskade, Carnage and Zeds Dead.

On 18 & 25 July 2014 they performed on the main stage of Tomorrowland

Over the Memorial Day weekend in May 2014, they performed during the first U.S. edition of Mysteryland which was held at the Bethel Woods Center for the Arts, the site of the notable Woodstock festival held in 1969. A few months later, Nervo played on the mainstage of the original version of Mysteryland, at Haarlemmermeer, Netherlands.

Nervo performed at the Forever Festival, Freedom Hill Amphitheater, Sterling Heights Michigan on 19 September 2014.

Nervo had also played during the Road to Ultra event in Paraguay, Asuncion, being this their first time stepping on Paraguayan soil.

2015
In April 2015, it was announced that Nervo will release a single with Kylie Minogue, Jake Shears and Nile Rodgers soon and will be featured on the upcoming album Collateral. In May 2015, Nervo played in the second and third days of Tomorrowland Brasil, the first edition of Tomorrowland (festival) held in Brazil during 1 – 3 May.

In July 2015, Nervo played on the second day of the WiSH Outdoor festival held in the Netherlands from 3 July. – 5 July. In December 2015, Nervo played on the second day of EDC festival in Brasil.

In October 2015, Nervo played at AMF (Amsterdam Music Festival) as part of ADE (Amsterdam Dance Event) on the opening night of the DJ Mag Top 100, received award ‘Highest Ranked Female DJ’ at the DJ Mag Top 100, remaining in the Top 50 at #45 and signed with Armada Music to launch their own label imprint ‘Got Me Baby! Records’.

2016
In June 2016 Nervo begun their Nervonation summer residency at USHUAIA in Ibiza, with dates running until the season closed in September.

In July 2016 Nervo played the T-Mobile Arena in Las Vegas, NV for the Miss USA 2016 Swimsuit Competition and also played the Opera Stage at Tomorrowland.

In August 2016– Nervo played Creamfields on the Arc Stage and also played at UNTOLD Festival, in Romania.

2017 
Nominated for ‘Best Party DJ’ at the inaugural World Dance Music Radio Awards at the Azteca Stadium on 29 March, Nervo played at the award ceremony in front of a crowd of thousands and a radio audience of over 10 million listeners across Spain, Central and South America and the Caribbean. Los 40, the radio group behind the WDM Radio Awards, broadcasts across 12 countries: Spain, Argentina, Chile, Colombia, Costa Rica, Ecuador, Guatemala, Panama, Paraguay, Dominican Republic, Nicaragua and Mexico.
In September they will perform in Israel as part of the international dance festival Life in Color.

2022 
Nervo returned to play on the Mainstage and the Library at Tomorrowland (festival) 2022  in Belgium; the first Tomorrowland festival after a two-year hiatus due to the COVID-19 pandemic. They hired a new photographer, Victor Duhaut (Duhautphotography) for the show.

Discography

 Collateral (2015)

DJ Magazine Top 100 DJs

See also

List of Billboard number-one dance club songs
List of artists who reached number one on the U.S. Dance Club Songs chart
List of artists who reached number one on the U.S. dance airplay chart

References

External links
Official website
Podcast Nervo Twins

Living people
Australian twins
Australian people of Italian descent
Astralwerks artists
Musical groups established in 2005
Women DJs
Twin musical duos
Female musical duos
2005 establishments in Australia
DJs from Melbourne
Australian house music groups
1982 births
Monstercat artists
Australian women pop singers
Electronic dance music duos
21st-century Australian singers
21st-century Australian women singers
Australian women in electronic music
Australian musical duos
Remixers
People from Ivanhoe, Victoria
People educated at Genazzano FCJ College